Eduardo Lara Lozano (born 4 September 1959 in Cali) is a Colombian football manager. Lara has coached all levels of the Colombian national youth team.He is currently the manager of Alianza.

Career 
He led the Colombian under-20s (U20s) in 2005 to win the Sudamericana and to the World Cup, where they lost in the quarter-finals to Argentina.

In 2007 his U20s failed to make it to the World Cup, but the under-17s qualified for the World Cup in Korea by finishing 2nd in the Sudamericana, by goal differential to Brazil.

On September 19, 2008, he was named as a provisional manager for a major Colombian football team after Jorge Luis Pinto was dismissed by the board of the Colombian Football Federation. He led the team in the matches against Paraguay and Brazil for the 2010 World Cup qualifiers.

He led U20s in the 2011 World Cup in Colombia in which the Colombian team beat France 4-1, Mali 2-0 and Korea 1-0 at the group stage. In the round of 16 the Colombian U20 team beat Costa Rica 3-2 but lost to Mexico 1-3 in the quarter-finals.

On November 12, 2019, C.D. El Nacional of the Ecuadorian Serie A announced the signing of Lara as the new manager.

Honours
Deportes Quindío
Categoría Primera B (1): 2001

References

External links

Living people
Colombian football managers
1959 births
Deportes Quindío managers
2017 CONCACAF Gold Cup managers
Colombia national football team managers
El Salvador national football team managers
América de Cali managers
Boyacá Chicó managers
Envigado F.C. managers
Once Caldas managers
Colombia national under-20 football team managers